Antal Nagy (born 16 May 1944 in Budapest) is a Hungarian former professional footballer who played as a striker He represented Hungary at the 1966 FIFA World Cup.

References

External links
 
 
 
 Antal Nagy at Voetbal International 
 
 

1944 births
Living people
Stateless people
Association football forwards
Hungarian footballers
Hungary international footballers
Budapest Honvéd FC players
Standard Liège players
FC Twente players
Olympique de Marseille players
Hércules CF players
UE Sant Andreu footballers
Wuppertaler SV players
Stade Malherbe Caen players
Royal Antwerp F.C. players
Leixões S.C. players
Ligue 1 players
Ligue 2 players
Eredivisie players
Belgian Pro League players
Segunda División players
Bundesliga players
Segunda Divisão players
Footballers from Budapest
1966 FIFA World Cup players
Hungarian expatriate footballers
Hungarian expatriate sportspeople in Belgium
Expatriate footballers in Belgium
Expatriate footballers in Portugal
Hungarian expatriate sportspeople in the Netherlands
Expatriate footballers in the Netherlands
Hungarian expatriate sportspeople in France
Expatriate footballers in France
Hungarian expatriate sportspeople in West Germany
Expatriate footballers in West Germany
Hungarian expatriate sportspeople in Spain
Expatriate footballers in Spain